First MicroFinance Bank-Afghanistan (FMFB-A) is a banking and loan institution of Aga Khan Agency for Microfinance which provides micro loans to poor and vulnerable population, particularly women. The Bank was established in 2004.

See also 

 First MicroFinance Bank-Tajikistan
 First MicroFinance Bank-Pakistan

References

External links 
 

Banks of Afghanistan
Aga Khan Development Network
Microfinance companies of Asia
Microfinance banks
Banks established in 2004